Cèdre Gouraud Forest is a woodland area in the Middle Atlas Mountain Range in Morocco. It was named for the French general Henri Gouraud. This forest is located on National Route 8 between Azrou and Ifrane. The forest is notable as a habitat for a sub-population of Barbary macaques, Macaca sylvanus.

See also
 Atlas cedar
 Atlas Mountains
 Mediterranean woodlands and forests

References
 C. Michael Hogan, (2008) Barbary Macaque: Macaca sylvanus, Globaltwitcher.com, ed. Nicklas Stromberg
 Justin McGuinness (2003) Morocco: The Travel Guide, Footprint Press Travel Guides, 560 pages

Line notes

Mediterranean forests, woodlands, and scrub
Forests of Morocco
Geography of Fès-Meknès